Gluta rugulosa is a tree of Borneo in the cashew and sumac family Anacardiaceae. The specific epithet  is from the Latin meaning "wrinkled", referring to the fruits.

Description
Its scaly bark is coloured brown.

Distribution and habitat
Gluta rugulosa is endemic to Borneo. Its habitat is lowland forests, including kerangas forests.

References

rugulosa
Endemic flora of Borneo
Trees of Borneo
Plants described in 1978